Nnadi is a surname. Notable people with the surname include:

Derrick Nnadi (born 1996), American football player
Iheoma Nnadi (born 1995), Nigerian beauty pageant titleholder

See also
Nnamdi